Sir Nigel Hugh Robert Allen Broomfield  (19 March 1937 – 29 October 2018) was a British diplomat.

Career
Broomfield was born in Nowshera and educated at Haileybury College and Trinity College, Cambridge. He joined the British Army and was commissioned in the 17th/21st Lancers in 1959, retiring with the rank of Major in 1968.

He joined the Foreign and Commonwealth Office (FCO) in 1969 and served in the British embassies in Bonn and Moscow, and with the British Military Government in Berlin, as well as senior posts at the FCO. He was Deputy High Commissioner, New Delhi, 1985–88; Ambassador to the German Democratic Republic 1988–90; Deputy Under Secretary of State (Defence) at the FCO 1990–92; and Ambassador to Germany 1993–97.

Broomfield was appointed CMG in 1986 and knighted KCMG in 1993.

After retiring from the Diplomatic Service, Sir Nigel was director of the Ditchley Foundation 1999–2004. He took part in the Atlantic Storm exercise in 2005. 
He was a non-executive director of TI Group 1998–2000 and of Smiths Group 2000–2007. 
He was also chairman of Leonard Cheshire Disability 2004-2009. 
He was honorary President of the German-British Chamber of Commerce. He was the founding non-executive chairman of Cambridge Quantum Computing.

He died of cancer on 29 October 2018 at the age of 81.

References

External links
BROOMFIELD, Sir Nigel (Hugh Robert Allen), Who's Who 2012, A & C Black, 2012; online edn, Oxford University Press, Dec 2011, accessed 9 April 2012
Sir Nigel Broomfield, KCMG on Debrett's People of Today

1937 births
2018 deaths
People educated at Haileybury and Imperial Service College
Alumni of Trinity College, Cambridge
17th/21st Lancers officers
Ambassadors of the United Kingdom to East Germany
Ambassadors of the United Kingdom to Germany
Knights Commander of the Order of St Michael and St George